Jiya Jale is an Indian television series that aired on 9X channel from 19 November 2007 to 19 June 2008.

Plot
The story is based on the life of an ordinary girl Sunaina, who was brought up in a close and caring family. The story takes off when Sunaina has just fallen in the love with the idea of love, when she meets Chandan. But they are also caught up in the trials and tribulations of hatred, deceit and betrayal—which changes their lives drastically. The question remains that:::Will Sunaina and Chandan be able to hold their love for each other above all these problems?

Cast
 Sriti Jha as Sunaina Kotak
 Saurabh Pandey as Chandan Bhimani
 Mahesh Thakur as Krishnakant Kotak
 Tapeshwari Sharma as Sujata Kotak
 Yasir Shah as Yug Suryavanshi
 Bharat Kaul as Virendra Bhimani
 Mihir Mishra 
 Natasha Sinha as Chandrika Bhimani
 Bharati Achrekar as Chandan's grandmother
 Rakhee Tandon as Chandan's maternal aunt
 Shital Thakkar 
 Sonia Rakkar / Rudrakshi Gupta as Chandan's stepmother
 Sushmita Daan as Anupama
 Nitin Chatterjee as Sunaina's younger brother Rohan
 Raj Logani as Dhanush Bhimani
 Mehul Nisar as Aatish

External links
Official website

9X (TV channel) original programming
Indian drama television series
2007 Indian television series debuts
2008 Indian television series endings